Prince Jeongwon or formally called as Internal Prince Jeongwon, personal name Wang Gyun was a Goryeo Royal family member as the great-great-great-grandson of Duke Yangyang who became the father of the last monarch, Gongyang. One year later, Gyun went again to Yuan for received Eoju (어주, 御酒) and while back, he was given title as Count Jeongwon (정원백, 定原伯). In 1355, he went to Yuan dynasty along with Gim Jin (김진) and went to "Harye Temple" (하례사) in Yuan in 1358 and after back became Buwongun.

Ancestry

References

Prince Jeongwon on Encykorea .

Year of birth unknown
Date of birth unknown
Year of death unknown
Date of death unknown
13th-century Korean people
14th-century Korean people